Konstantin Kapitonov Ushkov (1850–1918) was a Russian industrialist in Tatarstan. He was a prominent philanthropist and patron of the arts.

Kontantin was the son of Kapiton Ushkov who had developed the chemical plant in Mendeleyevsk.

He was father of Alexey Ushkov.

1850 births
1918 deaths
Russian industrialists
Russian philanthropists
19th-century philanthropists